John West may refer to:

People

Arts and sciences
John West (Australian poet) (died 2009), Australian poet and author
John West (horticulturist) (1856–1926), Australian journalist and horticulturist
John West (mathematician) (1756–1817), Scottish mathematician
John West (musician) (born 1964), hard rock singer, solo artist and member of Artension and Royal Hunt
John West (singer) (born 1983), pop soul singer, solo artist
John West (theatre) (1924–2008), Australian theatre historian and radio broadcaster
John West (writer) (1809–1873), Australian congregational minister, author and newspaper editor
John Anthony West (1932–2018), American author and Egyptologist
John B. West (born 1928), Australian-American respiratory physiologist
John G. West, American political scientist and Intelligent Design advocate

Politics

John West, 1st Earl De La Warr (1693–1766), British soldier, courtier and politician
John West, 2nd Earl De La Warr (1729–1777), British politician and soldier, son of the above
John West, 4th Earl De La Warr (1758–1795), British aristocrat and courtier
John West, 6th Baron De La Warr (1663–1723), English nobleman and courtier
John West (Australian politician) (1852–1931), Australian politician and trade unionist
John West (colonel) (1632–1691), American military officer and politician in colonial Virginia
John West (governor) (1590–1659), American politician, colonial Governor of Virginia
John West III (1676–1734), American justice, sheriff, and politician in colonial Virginia
John West (Scottish politician) (born 1988), Scottish politician, Scotland's youngest elected Local Authority Councillor
John Beattie West (died 1842), Conservative politician for Dublin City
John C. West (1922–2004), American politician, Governor of South Carolina

Sports
John West (cricketer, born 1844) (1844–1890), English first-class cricketer and umpire
John West (footballer) (1888–?), Irish footballer
Frank West (baseball) (John Franklin West, 1873–1932), Major League Baseball pitcher

Other
John West (captain) (1809–1888), Scottish-American inventor and businessperson
John West (pirate) (fl. 1713–1714), minor pirate in the Caribbean
John West (missionary) (1778–1845), Church of England missionary in Canada, reformer in England
John West (priest) (1806–1890), Dean of St Patrick's Cathedral, Dublin
John West (Royal Navy officer) (1774–1862), Royal Navy officer
John Alan West (1911–1964), British murder victim whose killing led to the last executions in Britain
John F. West (1920–2001), environmentalist, activist from Marin County, California
John C. West (philatelist) (1922–2016), vice-chancellor of the University of Bradford
John Briggs West (1852–1922), American publisher
John West (c. 1872–1922), African-American lynching victim in Hope, Arkansas; see Lynching of John West

Other uses
John West Foods, a Thai-owned English brand of canned fish (tuna, salmon, etc.)
 John West, a fictional character from the Frank Hardy 1950 novel Power Without Glory